The Collegiate Church of Santa Maria della Scala in Chieri is a late-Gothic Roman Catholic collegiate church, and the principal church or duomo, in the town of Chieri, Province of Turin, region of Piedmont, Italy.

History 
An ancient church on the site was erected by Bishop Landolfo of Turin in the 11th century, putatively on the site of a temple to Minerva.

The present church was rebuilt in the first decade of the 15th century, initially under the patronage of the Balbi and Bertoni families. The façade has buttresses and a tall stone portal sculpted with Romanesque motifs. The interior has three naves.

Interior 
The Chapel of the Blessed Virgin of the Graces (Beata Vergine della Grazie) was designed (1757) by Bernardo Vittone in order to house a venerated statue of the titular image of the Virgin (1637) by Botto. The other chapels include the Turinetti, decorated with stucco, as well as the chapels of the Crucifix and the Corpus Domini (Eucharist), which hold 17th-century canvases. In the southern nave is a canvas depicting the Resurrection of Christ by Francesco Fea and a fresco depicting the Adoration by the Magi in the Chapel of the Tabussi.

In the south transept is a Renaissance tabernacle attributed to Matteo Sanmicheli that houses an altarpiece depicting Saints Anthony Abbot and Sebastian, painted by Guglielmo Caccia. The north transept has an altarpiece depicting the Trinity by Giovanni Crosio. Behind the main altar are carved 15th-century wooden choir stalls. At the base of the bell tower, in the Gallieri Chapel, are a series of 13th-century frescoes depicting the life of John the Baptist, which were restored in the 20th century.

The sacristy contains Renaissance furniture and a 17th-century altarpiece of the Resurrection. The adjacent baptistry has the Tana Polyptych (1503) and 15th-century frescoes depicting the Passion of Christ by Guglielmo Fantini.

References 

Roman Catholic churches in Chieri
11th-century Roman Catholic church buildings in Italy
17th-century Roman Catholic church buildings in Italy
Romanesque architecture in Piedmont
Gothic architecture in Piedmont
Baroque architecture in Piedmont